Topouzian or Topuzian is an Armenian surname. It may refer to:

Ara Topouzian (born 1969), Armenian musician and kanon player
Nshan Topouzian (born 1966), prelate and bishop of the Armenian Apostolic Church See of Cilicia
Yervant Topouzian, Armenian activist, one of the 20 victims in The 20 Hunchakian gallows